Yasuko Sakata (坂田 靖子, Sakata Yasuko) is a Japanese manga artist. She is considered to be a successor to the Year 24 Group that is credited with renewing shōjo manga.

Life 
She was born on 25 February 1953 in Osaka, Japan. She now lives in Kanazawa, Ishikawa Prefecture. Her official debut was with the work Saikon Kyousou Kyoku (再婚狂騒曲), published in Hana to Yume in 1975.  In the late 1970s and early 1980s, she was involved in the yaoi dōjinshi movement, having co-coined the term "yaoi" with Akiko Hatsu. One of Sakata's dōjinshi, Loveri, was amongst the very first to be described as "yaoi".  Her best known works are Jikan wo Warerani, Basil Shi no Yuuga na Seikatsu (The Elegant Life of Mr Basil), about a 19th-century British aristocrat, and Yamiyo no Hon (serialized 1982-1985 in Asahi Sonorama's Duo magazine).  She won the Agency for Cultural Affairs Media Arts Festival Grand Prize in the Manga Division in 1997.  Most of her work is short stories - as of 2003, one catalogue listed over 40 of her stories. The type of stories she tells include traditional Japanese ghost stories, science fiction, mysteries, and Western and Chinese stories. She is marked for her talent at "casually portraying" everyday life.

Works

 再婚狂騒曲 Saikon Kyousou Kyoku
闇月王 Yami Gatsuoo
 バジル氏の優雅な生活 Basil Shi no Yuuga na Seikatsu (The Elegant Life of Mr Basil)
 マーガレットとご主人の底抜け珍道中 maagaretto togo shujin no sokonuke chindouchuu
チューくんとハイちゃん chuu-kun to hai chan

References

External links
SAKATA Box - Official website (Japanese)

1953 births
Living people
Manga artists from Osaka Prefecture
People from Takatsuki, Osaka